VSA may refer to:

Places
 Carlos Rovirosa Pérez International Airport (IATA: VSA), Mexico

Organizations 
 Vietnamese Student Association, a union for Vietnamese-Americans to interact with one another
 VSA (Kennedy Center), formerly known as Very Special Arts, a U.S.-based international organization focusing on arts education for disabled people
 The Violin Society of America, an American organization concerning string instruments
 Veterans for a Secure America, an American political coalition
 Veterans for a Strong America, an American political action committee 
 Victorian Speleological Association, an Australian caving organization
 Voluntary Service Aberdeen, a Scottish social care charity
 Volunteer Service Abroad, a New Zealand volunteering agency

Science and technology 

 Vacuum swing adsorption, a gas separation technology
 Van der Waals surface
 Vector signal analyser
Vehicle Service Agreement, an extended warranty for a motor vehicle
 Vehicle Stability Assist, technology that improves a vehicle's stability
 Vendor-specific attributes, in the RADIUS networking protocol
 Very Small Array, a radio telescope
 Viable systems approach, a systems theory
 vSphere Storage Appliance
 Voice stress analysis, a means of measuring stress responses in the human voice